The First Siege of Anandpur  was a six day long siege at Anandpur led by the Rajas of the Sivalik Hills and the Gujar and Ranghar tribesmen against the armies of the Sikh under Guru Gobind Singh.

Prelude

The hill Rajas were concerned about Guru Gobind Singh's rising power and influence in their region. The Mughal generals had failed to subdue the Guru in the Battle of Anandpur (1700). The Rajas appealed to Mughal emperor Aurangzeb to aid them. Raja Bhup Chand of Hundar opposed seeking the aid of the emperor. He insisted the Rajas should be able to win themselves. The Rajas of hill states, including Jammu, Nurpur, Mandi, Bhutan, Kullu, Kionthal, Guler, Chamba, Srinagar, Dadhwal, Hindur and others. They met in council under Ajmer Chand. Ajmer Chand convinced the council to follow him. Ajmer Chand recrutied the Gujars and Ranghars both of whom had previous hostilities with the Gurus. They were led by Jagatullah Combined the forces were over 300,000

Ammunition was distributed amongst the Rajas and they began to march at night.

They sent a letter to the Guru, asking him to pay the arrears of rent for Anandpur (which lay in Ajmer Chand's territory) or leave the city. The Guru insisted that the land was bought by his father, and was his property.

Duni Chand led five hundred men from Majha region to assist the Guru. Reinforcements from other areas also arrived to help the Guru.

The Siege

Day One 
The Rajas and their allies besieged Anandpur. The Sikhs had taken positions in the fort of Fatehgarh, Taragarh, Keshgarh, and Lohgarh. The Guru ordered them to stay on the defensive. Sher Singh and Nahar Singh with 500 soldiers each gaurded Lohgarh while Bhai Udai Singh with the men of Duni Chand took Fatehgarh. Ajit Singh with 100 soldiers gaurded Taragarh. 

Raja Ajmer Chand with others launched an attack on Taragarh first where Ajit Singh was stationed. A fierce battle ensued. Many Sikhs were killed and Raja Ghumand Chand of Kangra was wounded. The Sikh managed to hold off the Mughals.

Later the first day the rajas fired canons on the Guru's forts. Raja Kesari Chand of Jaswan with his troops, the Gujars and the Ranghars attacked Lohgarh and the outposts of Udai Singh. Arrows and bullets rained down and the attacking army had lost half of its strength. The Gujars and Ranghars were on the verge of retreat but Jagatullah managed to rally his men and they launched a fierce counter attack. Seeing this Ajit Singh with his troops, numbering 100, joined Udai Singh. Kesari Chand and Jagatullah's troops were forced to retreat.

Following defeats on the first day the Rajas held a council. The Rajas had planned to launch a three-sided attack. Kesari Chand would attack from the right flank and Jagatullah would attack from the left flank. Ajmer Chand would attack from the front.

Soon after Jagatullah would be shot in the chest by Sahib Singh and died. Ghumand Chand led the alliance troops to attack the location of Jagatullah's body. A great massacre ensued as Sikhs defended their position. As nightfell Ghumand Chand and his allied forces fell back for rest and the Sikh captured the body of Jagatullah.

The Rajas again held a council at night, in which Ajmer Chand proposed reconciliation with the Guru. Many Rajas agreed, but Raja Kesari Chand of Jaswal and Raja Bhup Chand opposed the proposal, and suggested a more determined fight the next day, to oust the Guru from Anandpur.

Day Two 
Next day Ajmer Chand launched a firerce attack on Fatehgarh with a do-or-die mentality. Fatehghar was still in construction with one of its walls only being half made. Bhagwan SIngh was one of the commanders of the fort. A five hour battle ensued where many soldiers on both sides died. Bhagwan Singh died in this battle.

Other attacks ensued all throughout the day. Ajit Singh launched a counterattack in the afternoon. Thousands of Sikhs joined this counterattack. Ajit Singh's horse was killed, but he countinued to fight. The troops of the alliance began to retreat, but Raja Kesari Chand managed to rally his troops and they stood their ground. Following this the alliance of the Rajas, Gujars, and Ranghars decided to wait out the Sikh.

Day Three 
Fighting resumed as early as dawn in certain places. Ajmer Chand after the day before's success attacked  Anandpur. The attack lasted all day and spilled into tommorow. This attack was disasters for Ajmer Chand, but Sikh veteran generals such as Bagh Singh and Gharbar Singh fell in the battle.

The Sikhs did an attack at night with only swords which killed many of the Rajas.

Ajmer Chand decided to call another council of the Rajas. The Raja of Mandi insisted on peace, but his requests were dismissed. It was decided that the Rajas should put their focus on capturing Lohgarh.

Duni Chand  hearng rumors an elephant would attack and hearing Guru Gobind Singh comment that Duni Chand is the elephant of the Sikh army grew wary. At night Duni Chand and his troops ran away and deserted the Guru. Duni Chand and his troops decided to go to Dhir Mal.

Day Four 

As the morning of the fourth day began the army commanded by Ajmer Cand positioned themselves outside of Lohgarh. The Rajas had planned to send one intoxicated Prasadi elephant to Lohgarh in hopes it would break the gates of the fort. The entirety of the elephant except its tip was covered in steel.

The elephant was hit and it went into a rageful furry to Lohgarh. Behind the elephant charged the army of the Hill Rajas. Guru Gobind Singh asked Bhai Bachitar Singh to become his elephant to which he agreed. He was given a spear and took the Gurus blessings. Bachitarr Singh was ready to face the drunken elephant. Next Udai Singh took the blessings of the Guru and was given a sword to killed Kesari Chand with. Udai Singh charged and slaughtered his away through the soldiers to get to his target.

The elephant had made its way to the gates of the fort. It had killed any Sikhs. Bachittar Singh opened the gates of the fort. He raised his spear and pierced it through the armor of the elephant wounding it. The eplehant turned around and killed many soldiers of the Hill Rajas and was unstoppable.

As this happened Udai Singh met Kesari Chand. He shouted, "Kesari Chand come and hit". Kesari Chand hit but missed. Udai Singh chopped Chand's head off. He put the head on a spear and raised it up high as he made his way back to the gates of the fort. Mokham Singh soon after finished the elephant off. Bhai Sahib Singh injured the Raja of Handur and the army of the Raja's retreated.

Day Five 
The Hill Rajas once again held a council and peace was considered, but was not taken.

On the following day, the troops of Raja Ghumand Chand of Kangra attacked Anandpur. A bloody battle happened. Ghumand Chand's horse was shot by Alim Singh. A melle happened around the Raja. His men managed to keep the SIkh at bay temporarily. The battle lasted till evening, with varyiing results and resulted in the death of Ghumand Chand at the hands of Bhai Himmat Singh.

Final Day and End of the Siege 
The Rajas decided to send a peace treaty to Guru Gobind Singh after a council was held. They sent a letter which said, "Satguru, we are susceptible to the mistakes. We swear on the cow and the sacred thread that we will never raid the town of Anandpur. We are ashamed to show our faces to the hill people. If you abandon the Fort Anandgarh just once and come back later, it will help us to restore our dignity." Guru Gobind Singh was hesitiant to accep t the Rajas demands, but the Sikhs insited upon it. After meeting Sikh commanders who proposed leaving Guru Gobind Singh and the Sikhs left Anandpur.

Aftermath

The Guru left for Nirmoh village (Nirmohgarh). The deal turned out to truly be a plan to attack the Sikhs and the Guru while they were weak. The Rajas attacked and the Sikh fought the Battle of Nirmohgarh (1702).

References

Anandpur (1701)
18th century in India
Punjab, India
Sikh Empire
History of India